Richard Jameson may refer to:

 Richard Willis Jameson (1851–1899), Canadian politician
 Richard Jameson (loyalist) (1953–2000), Northern Irish businessman and loyalist